The 1970 Maryland gubernatorial election was held on November 3, 1970. Incumbent Democrat Marvin Mandel defeated Republican nominee Charles Stanley Blair with 65.73% of the vote. This election was the first of eight consecutive Democratic gubernatorial victories in Maryland, a streak not broken until the election of Republican Bob Ehrlich in 2002.

Primary elections
Primary elections were held on September 15, 1970.

Democratic primary

Candidates
Marvin Mandel, incumbent Governor
William Edward Roberts Sr.
Dan W. Salamone 	
George Herman Wright
Milton Rothstein

Results

Republican primary

Candidates
Charles Stanley Blair, former Secretary of State of Maryland
Peter James
John C. Webb Jr.

Results

General election

Candidates
Major party candidates
Marvin Mandel, Democratic
Charles Stanley Blair, Republican 

Other candidates
Robert Woods Merkle Sr., American

Results

References

1970
Maryland
Gubernatorial